The 2022 season was the Buffalo Bills' 53rd in the National Football League (NFL), their 63rd as a franchise,  their eighth full season under the ownership of Terry and Kim Pegula, and their sixth under the head coach/general manager tandem of Sean McDermott and Brandon Beane.

The Bills entered the 2022 season as two-time defending AFC East champions. The Bills clinched the AFC East for the third consecutive season and improved on their 11–6 record from last season. The Week 17 game against Cincinnati was declared a no-contest after Bills' safety Damar Hamlin collapsed on the field. He was given CPR for ten minutes before being rushed to the hospital. Despite the incident, the Bills won their last game of the season to finish 13–3, tied for the best record in the history of the franchise, but they lost control of their destiny to clinch the number 1 seed in the AFC as a result of the cancellation, which allowed  Kansas City to clinch the number 1 seed in the AFC the day before their last game of the regular season despite having the head-to-head tiebreaker. In the playoffs, they defeated Miami, 34–31. However, they fell to Cincinnati 27–10, losing in the divisional round for the second consecutive season.

2022 was the final season in the Bills' lease on Highmark Stadium. Negotiations are being finalized for the construction of a new stadium for the team as of January 2023; the team had stated that it would not renew its lease on Highmark Stadium unless an agreement for a new stadium was struck by the end of the 2022 season.

Transactions

Arrivals

Departures

Trades

Draft

Draft trades

Undrafted free agents

Staff

Final roster

Preseason
The Bills' preseason opened with a last-second win against Indianapolis, after trailing 24–10 late in the 4th quarter. This extended their preseason win streak to a record 9 games. Following a Week 2 win over Denver, their streak ended at 10 games with a loss in Week 3 to Carolina.

Regular season
On May 9, the NFL announced that the Bills would host the Tennessee Titans at 7:15 p.m.

The remainder of the Bills' 2022 schedule was announced on May 12.

Schedule

Note: Intra-division opponents are in bold text.

Game summaries

Week 1: at Los Angeles Rams
NFL Kickoff Game

The Bills put up 31 points over the defending Super Bowl champions in a primetime win. Josh Allen had 4 total touchdowns while Matthew Stafford was held to just 1.

Week 2: vs. Tennessee Titans

Stefon Diggs had 3 touchdowns on Monday Night Football and the Bills thumped the defending #1 seed in the AFC Titans 41–7 after losing to them the last 2 seasons. The defense held the Titans to 187 yards of total offense and Matt Milano had an interception returned for a touchdown. Unfortunately, the Bills would lose Dane Jackson and Micah Hyde to neck injuries during the game, with Hyde later being ruled out for the season with a herniated disc.

Week 3: at Miami Dolphins

The Bills sideline was in the sweltering sun while the home Dolphins were on the shaded side of Hard Rock Stadium, a major factor contributing to the Dolphins home field advantage. After trading touchdowns in the first half, the Bills had a 17–14 lead going into the fourth quarter, but Chase Edmonds scored his 2nd touchdown of the game to give the Dolphins a 21–17 lead. The Bills responded with an 8-minute drive, but on 4th and Goal from the 1-yard line, Josh Allen's pass fell incomplete and turned the ball over on downs. The Bills forced a Dolphins punt, but Thomas Morstead's kick hit Trent Sherfield in the buttocks and deflected backwards and out of the end zone for a safety to make the score 21–19. The play instantly became known as "The Butt Punt."

The Bills, only needing a field goal instead of a touchdown to win, got the ball back with no timeouts. With 18 seconds left, Allen avoided a sack and passed the ball to Isaiah McKenzie who tried to get out of bounds at the MIA-35 but was tackled just short of the sideline. The Bills hustled to get back to the line of scrimmage in time, but the clock hit all zeros and players on both teams collapsed in exhaustion. The Bills lost 21–19 in an instant classic, and fell to 2–1. The Dolphins became the only 3–0 team in the AFC.

Week 4: at Baltimore Ravens

Despite Baltimore climbing to a 20–3 lead at one point in the second quarter, with 10 of the Ravens' points coming off Bills turnovers, the Bills scored 20 unanswered points of their own and shut out Lamar Jackson and the Ravens offense in the second half. A key interception of Jackson by Bills safety Jordan Poyer in the fourth quarter set up Buffalo's game-winning field goal, as Ravens head coach John Harbaugh controversially opted to go for a touchdown on fourth and goal instead of attempting a go-ahead field goal.

Week 5: vs. Pittsburgh Steelers

After a close win in Baltimore, the Bills came back home to play the Steelers, resulting in a 38–3 blowout victory. Josh Allen threw for a career-high 424 yards, also matching a career high of four passing touchdowns, in addition to matching the franchise record for the longest play from scrimmage when he threw a 98-yard touchdown pass to Gabe Davis on the third play of the game. Steelers rookie quarterback Kenny Pickett made his first career start during the game, taking the place of previous starter and former Bills backup quarterback Mitchell Trubisky. With the win, Buffalo improved to 4–1.

Week 6: at Kansas City Chiefs

In a rematch of the previous season's AFC Divisional playoff game against Kansas City, which saw Buffalo lose in overtime after allowing the Chiefs to tie the game with just 13 seconds left in regulation, the Bills and Chiefs competed toe-to-toe on both offense and defense until the fourth quarter. After Buffalo's defense limited the Chiefs to a field goal in the quarter and forced a three-and-out on the Chiefs' penultimate drive, Josh Allen marched the Bills down the field, throwing a game-winning touchdown pass to Dawson Knox with 1:04 left in regulation. Chiefs quarterback Patrick Mahomes was intercepted by Bills cornerback Taron Johnson two plays later, preventing another last-minute scoring drive by Kansas City in addition to allowing Buffalo to avenge its playoff loss. The Bills improved to 5–1 with the win, attaining the best record in the AFC heading into their bye week.

Week 8: vs. Green Bay Packers

Week 9: at New York Jets

The Bills squandered a 14–3 first-half lead and lost to Zach Wilson and the rival Jets 20–17, thanks to a strong performance from the Jets' defense and run game (despite missing starting running back Breece Hall due to a season-ending injury), in addition to a fourth-quarter field goal by Greg Zuerlein set up by a 6-minute drive that started at New York's four-yard line. In addition, Allen, who scored two rushing touchdowns but also threw two interceptions during the game, suffered an elbow injury on Buffalo's final drive, which ended with a turnover on downs and allowed the Jets to run out the clock. With the upset loss, the Bills fell to 6–2.

Week 10: vs. Minnesota Vikings

The Bills blew their second consecutive double-digit lead, squandering a 27–10 third quarter lead. After the Bills stopped a long Vikings drive that stalled within Buffalo's one-yard line, a botched snap on Buffalo's ensuing play resulted in a fumble recovered by Vikings linebacker Eric Kendricks for a touchdown that put Minnesota up 30–27. The Bills would score a field goal that tied the score at 30 apiece and led to overtime.

After the Vikings scored first on a 33-yard field goal by Greg Joseph, Allen marched the Bills downfield, but threw a game-ending interception to Patrick Peterson from Minnesota's 20-yard line, his second of the game and sixth in three games. With a 33–30 overtime loss, their second consecutive upset loss, the Bills fell to 6–3 and third place in the division.

This was Stefon Diggs' first game against his former team after he was traded from Minnesota to Buffalo before the 2020 season. Diggs and Vikings receiver Justin Jefferson, who was drafted with the first-round pick Buffalo sent for Diggs, both had strong performances in the game, as they both surpassed 100 yards receiving and made remarkable one-handed catches during the course of what was later called the "game of the year" by several analysts.

Week 11: vs. Cleveland Browns

Due to a severe lake effect snowstorm in Buffalo, this game was moved to Ford Field in Detroit in a similar fashion to the Bills' 2014 home game against the New York Jets, which was moved due to the "Snowvember" storm that dumped 7 feet of snow on Highmark Stadium. This was the Bills' second home game in franchise history moved to Detroit.  Since Buffalo was scheduled to go to Detroit for the following week's game anyway, this relocation worked in their favor.

Week 12: at Detroit Lions
Thanksgiving Day games

In Buffalo's third Thanksgiving Day game in four years, Detroit, winner of three straight after a 1–6 start, kept pace with the Bills in a back-and-forth affair and took the lead in the fourth quarter. Josh Allen led a go-ahead touchdown drive to retake the lead, although kicker Tyler Bass missed the extra point, his first such miss since the 2020 season. Despite the Lions tying the game with a field goal with 23 seconds left on the clock, Allen put the Bills into field goal range on the next drive with a 36-yard pass to Stefon Diggs, who was double-covered, and Bass made the game-winning 45–yard kick, allowing Buffalo to win 28–25 and improve to 8–3.

This would also mark the Bills' third consecutive Thanksgiving Day win.

Week 13: at New England Patriots

Aside from a 48-yard catch-and-run touchdown pass in the first quarter from Patriots quarterback Mac Jones to Marcus Jones, who normally plays cornerback, the Bills kept New England's offense in check, forcing numerous punts, and dominated the game with a balanced offense between the passing and rushing attacks, resulting in a 24–10 win in favor of Buffalo. With the team's first division win of the season and fifth win in six games over the Patriots, Buffalo improved to 9–3.

Week 14: vs. New York Jets

Week 15: vs. Miami Dolphins

Buffalo hosted the Dolphins in a rematch of week 3's game, with weather conditions featuring lake-effect snow in contrast to the hot, humid conditions in Miami earlier that year. Early in the game, fans threw snowballs onto the field before head official Bill Vinovich warned that the Bills would be assessed a 15-yard unsportsmanlike conduct penalty if any snowballs hit Dolphins players despite no rule existing on that matter.

The Dolphins took the early 3–0 lead, but the Bills responded with a quick drive to take the lead with a touchdown pass to Quintin Morris from Josh Allen. After Buffalo took a 21–13 halftime lead, Miami stormed back with two quick passing touchdowns from Tua Tagovailoa to Jaylen Waddle and Tyreek Hill, respectively, to retake the lead, then forced a fumble on Allen to set up a field goal to make the score 29–21 in its favor. Allen and the Bills offense would nonetheless adjust to Miami's heavy blitz, setting up a Dawson Knox touchdown reception with several quarterback runs to avoid pressure, with Allen barely crossing the plane on Buffalo's ensuing two-point conversion attempt to tie the game at 29. After a stalled drive by Dolphins, Buffalo received the ball back with under six minutes left, but drove down the field from its own 14-yard-line to the Miami 7-yard-line, setting up Tyler Bass's game-winning field goal. With the 32–29 win, their 10th in their last 12 games against the Dolphins, the Bills improved to 11–3 and clinched their fourth-straight playoff berth.

Week 16: at Chicago Bears

In frigid conditions, Buffalo trailed Chicago 10–6 at halftime, partly due to Tyler Bass missing an extra point and a field goal in addition to a redzone interception by Josh Allen, but stormed back in the second half thanks to strong performances by running backs Devin Singletary and James Cook, outscoring the Bears 29–3 the rest of the way and holding dual-threat quarterback Justin Fields to just six yards rushing in the game. With the dominant win, the Bills improved to 12–3 and clinched their third straight AFC East division title.

Week 17: at Cincinnati Bengals

The game was postponed with 5:58 remaining in the 1st quarter due to an injury to Damar Hamlin, who was sent to the hospital in critical condition after collapsing on the field. The NFL released a statement that said that the game will not be resumed during the week, as well the team's week 18 game will be played as it is scheduled. The game was ultimately declared no contest, and it was officially canceled on January 5. It was the only time in NFL history that a regular season game has been canceled after starting and was never made up.

Week 18: vs. New England Patriots

Playing one week after Hamlin's collapse and hospitalization, Buffalo dedicated this game to him as part of league-wide tributes to Hamlin, who was continuing to recover in the ICU. Despite three passing touchdowns by Mac Jones, the Bills countered with two kick return touchdowns by Nyheim Hines and three passing scores from Allen, in addition to intercepting Jones three times. The Bills matched a franchise record by notching their 13th win of the season, clinching the #2 seed in the AFC and ensuring that a hypothetical AFC Championship matchup with the Chiefs, who clinched the #1 seed but would have lost the tiebreaker to Buffalo had they won the previous game, would be played on a neutral site due to special changes to playoff seeding in light of the previous game's cancellation.

Standings

Division

Conference

Postseason

Schedule

Game summaries

AFC Wild Card Playoffs: vs. (7) Miami Dolphins

AFC Divisional Playoffs: vs. (3) Cincinnati Bengals

While the Bills were widely criticized by the media for losing this playoff game in blowout fashion, several players on the team revealed their emotional exhaustion after the game due to several events that occurred to the team and the city of Buffalo during the course of the season and offseason, including Hamlin's collapse, two severe blizzards, including one during Christmas that killed dozens in Erie County, owner Kim Pegula suffering "unspecified health issues" in June that were later revealed by her daughter Jessica Pegula to be cardiac arrest, and the 2022 Buffalo shooting in May. Guard Rodger Saffold and safety Micah Hyde stated that the team had "run out of gas" after facing constant adversity throughout the "emotionally draining" season.

Notes

References

External links
 

Buffalo
Buffalo Bills seasons
Buffalo Bills
AFC East championship seasons